Kannelmäki railway station is a railway station on the Helsinki commuter rail network located in northern Helsinki, Finland. It is located approximately nine kilometres to the north/northwest of Helsinki Central railway station.

The station is located in the district of Kannelmäki, between the stations of Pohjois-Haaga and Malminkartano, serving the I/P commuter line between Central Helsinki and Vantaankoski.

The station has two platforms, one for southbound and one for northbound trains. There are four lifts available and several local bus connections are available near the station.

In October 2008 the platforms were fitted with information screens.

References

External links

Railway stations in Helsinki
Railway stations opened in 1975